In mathematics, in abstract algebra, a multivariate polynomial  over a field such that the Laplacian of  is zero is termed a harmonic polynomial.

The harmonic polynomials form a vector subspace of the vector space of polynomials over the field. In fact, they form a graded subspace. For the real field, the harmonic polynomials are important in mathematical physics.

The Laplacian is the sum of second partials with respect to all the variables, and is an invariant differential operator under the action of the orthogonal group via the group of rotations.

The standard separation of variables theorem  states that every multivariate polynomial over a field can be decomposed as a finite sum of products of a radial polynomial and a harmonic polynomial. This is equivalent to the statement that the polynomial ring is a free module over the ring of radial polynomials.

See also
Harmonic function
Spherical harmonics
Zonal spherical harmonics
Multilinear polynomial

References

 Lie Group Representations of Polynomial Rings by Bertram Kostant published in the American Journal of Mathematics Vol 85 No 3 (July 1963) 

Abstract algebra
Polynomials